Hyloxalus fascianigrus is a species of frogs in the family Dendrobatidae.

It is endemic to Colombia. Its natural habitats are tropical moist montane forests and rivers. It is threatened by habitat loss.

References

fascianigrus
Amphibians of Colombia
Endemic fauna of Colombia
Amphibians described in 1998
Taxonomy articles created by Polbot